The fourth season of the television drama Without a Trace premiered September 29, 2005 on CBS and ended on May 18, 2006. There are 24 episodes in this season. Roselyn Sánchez joins the cast as Elena Delgado in this season.

The fourth season of Without a Trace has not had an official release on DVD in region 1, though it is available as an MOD. It was released in region 2 in Germany on May 15, 2008 on and in the UK on July 14, 2008. In region 4 the fourth season was released on July 1, 2009.

Cast
 Anthony LaPaglia as FBI Missing Persons Unit Special Agent John Michael "Jack" Malone
 Poppy Montgomery as FBI Missing Persons Unit Special Agent Samantha "Sam" Spade
 Marianne Jean-Baptiste as FBI Missing Persons Unit Special Agent Vivian "Viv" Johnson
 Enrique Murciano as FBI Missing Persons Unit Special Agent Danny Taylor
 Eric Close as FBI Missing Persons Unit Special Agent Martin Fitzgerald
 Roselyn Sánchez as FBI Missing Persons Unit Special Agent Elena Delgado

Episodes

References

Without a Trace seasons
2005 American television seasons
2006 American television seasons